The Regal Cinema is an Art deco movie theatre located at Colaba Causeway, in Mumbai, India.  Built by Framji Sidhwa, the first film to be aired at the Regal was the Laurel and Hardy work The Devil's Brother in 1933.

According to the Limca Book of Records, it is the first air conditioned theatre of India.

History
The Regal Cinema was built during the cinema boom of the 1930s during which Plaza Central, New Empire, Broadway, Eros and Metro all opened in Mumbai. Opened in 1933, Regal was designed by Charles Stevens, the son of the famous 19th century architect F. W. Stevens. Its interiors with extensive mirror-work were designed by the Czech artist Karl Schara. The main auditorium had a motif of sunrays in pale orange and jade green. Its interiors were designed to create an impression of airiness, coolness and size in harmony with the modern simplicity of the exteriors. The Regal was built completely in reinforced concrete cement (RCC), fully air conditioned, and had an underground parking lot for patrons. The elevator up from the parking area was a major innovation at the time.

The cinema was the third venue to host the Filmfare Awards night.  Today, it is a multi-use building combining a cinema with shops at street level.

The Regal Cinema was the lead theatre hosting the 17th Mumbai Academy of Moving Image (MAMI), held in 2015, starting from Friday, 29 October 2015.
Also, The Regal Cinema was the lead theatre hosting the 18th. Mumbai Academy of Moving Image (MAMI), held in 2016.

References

External links

  Legends of the causeway – Regal cinema

Culture of Mumbai
Cinemas in Mumbai
The Victorian and Art Deco Ensemble of Mumbai
Theatres completed in 1933
1933 establishments in India